Ashling Cole is an American singer. She has worked with Carlos Santana, Prince, Marcus Miller, Bootsy Collins and others.

Background 
Cole was born between 1974 and 1975 in Vancouver, but her family quickly relocated to Dublin, Ireland. As a teenager she attended City College of San Francisco, and moved to Hollywood in the early 90s.

Discography

Guest Appearances

References

External links
 http://www.ashlingcole.com/
 recordnet.com
 poup.net
 

Music YouTubers
Living people
Music-related YouTube channels
1974 births